Victor E. Boudreau (born May 3, 1970) is a New Brunswick politician. He was a member of the Legislative Assembly of New Brunswick from 2014 to 2018, representing the ridings of Shediac-Cap-Pelé and Shediac-Beaubassin-Cap-Pelé for the New Brunswick Liberal Association, and was the Leader of the Opposition in the legislature.

Biography

Boudreau was recruited to the Liberal Party in 1989 by Dominic LeBlanc and he attended the 1990 federal Liberal leadership convention to support Jean Chrétien. Chrétien, who was then without a seat in the House of Commons of Canada, ran in a by-election in Boudreau's riding of Beauséjour.

Following this initial engagement, Boudreau became very active in politics. He served as president of the Young Liberals and then worked for Fernand Robichaud when he was a member of the Cabinet of Canada and for Bernard Richard—his predecessor as MLA for Shediac-Cap-Pelé—when he was in the New Brunswick cabinet

Prior to his election to the legislature, he worked as village administrator of Cap-Pelé.

Career as legislator

He was elected to the legislature in a by-election on October 4, 2004 to replace Bernard Richard, who had resigned to become the provincial ombudsman. Boudreau role of Health & Wellness critic in the shadow cabinet shortly after his election.

Graham ministry

He was re-elected in 2006 and took on the role of finance minister in the cabinet of Shawn Graham. Boudreau was given several additional responsibilities, both ministerial and non-ministerial.

Back in opposition
Following the Liberal party's defeat in the 2010 election, Boudreau was named interim leader of the party on November 10, 2010 after Graham stepped down. Brian Gallant was elected leader of the party on October 27, 2012, and assumed the role of opposition leader when he won the district of Kent in a by-election on April 15, 2013.

Gallant ministry

He was named Minister of Health by Premier-elect Brian Gallant on 7 October 2014. He chaired the Strategic Program Review, which was designed to solve a large gap, between $485 million and $600 million in the account books of the province.

References

External links
Hon. Victor Boudreau

Members of the Executive Council of New Brunswick
New Brunswick Liberal Association MLAs
Living people
People from Shediac
1970 births
21st-century Canadian politicians
Finance ministers of New Brunswick
Health ministers of New Brunswick